Jefferson County International Airport  is a public-use airport located four nautical miles (7 km) southwest of the central business district of Port Townsend, a town in Jefferson County, Washington, United States. It is owned by the Port of Port Townsend.

Facilities and aircraft 
It has one runway designated 9/27 with an asphalt surface measuring 3,000 by 75 feet (914 x 23 m).

For the 12-month period ending April 30, 2009, the airport had 58,000 aircraft operations, an average of 158 per day: 97% general aviation and 3% air taxi. At that time there were 107 aircraft based at this airport: 94% single-engine, 5% multi-engine and 1% ultralight.

Emergency services to the airport are provided by East Jefferson Fire and Rescue’s Station 1-3, located adjacent of the airport.

There is no tower at the airfield, and the runway is not regularly lit at night.

The Port Townsend Aero Museum is located on the grounds of the airport, with several aircraft and artifacts on display. The museum is open to the public.

References

External links 
  Jefferson County International Airport at Port of Port Townsend website
 Aerial photo as of 21 June 1990 from USGS The National Map via TerraServer-USA

Airports in Washington (state)
Transportation buildings and structures in Jefferson County, Washington
Airport